Arne Hoffstad (21 September 1900 – 26 September 1980) was a Norwegian newspaper editor and Conservative Party politician. Born in Sandefjord, the son of a botanist, he became the editor of the local Sandefjords Blad newspaper.

Early life 

He was born in Sandefjord, the son of Olaf Alfred Hoffstad (1865–1943) and his second wife Birgitte Lucie Richter (born 1868). He was a half-brother of Einar Hoffstad. He had commerce school by education, and was hired as a sub-editor in Sandefjords Blad in 1925. From 2 January 1931 he was the editor-in-chief of Sandefjords Blad. He doubled as manager, but withdrew as such in 1964. In 1971 he celebrated his 40th anniversary as editor-in-chief.

Hoffstad was also an active politician, and chaired the Norwegian Young Conservatives from 1937 to 1940. He was a national board member of the Conservative Party, chaired Sandefjord Conservative Party and was a member of Sandefjord city council.

Hoffstad founded Høyres Bladeierforening in 1935, and was chairman here for 20 years. He was a board member of the Norsk Bladeierforening from 1937 and chairman from 1951 to 1953. He also chaired the Norske Avisers Landsforbund from 1952 to 1953, was a board member of the Norwegian News Agency and board member and deputy chairman of Avisenes Informasjonskontor from 1954 to 1970.

References 

1900 births
1980 deaths
People from Sandefjord
Conservative Party (Norway) politicians
Vestfold politicians
Norwegian newspaper editors
20th-century Norwegian writers